The Testing Maturity Model (TMM) was based on the Capability Maturity Model, and first produced by the Illinois Institute of Technology.

Its aim to be used in a similar way to CMM, that is to provide a framework for assessing the maturity of the test processes in an organisation, and so providing targets on improving maturity. 

Each level from 2 upwards has a defined set of processes and goals, which lead to practices and sub-practices.

The TMM has been since replaced by the Test Maturity Model integration and is now managed by the TMMI Foundation.

See also 
 Enterprise Architecture Assessment Framework

References
The article describing this concept was first published in: Crosstalk, August and September 1996
"Developing a Testing Maturity Model: Parts I and II", Ilene Burnstein, Taratip Suwannasart, and C.R. Carlson,
Illinois Institute of Technology (article not in online archives at Crosstalk online anymore)

Software testing
Maturity models